Public sex may refer to:

 Public sex, a type of sexual activity that takes place in a public context
 Public Sex (film), a British romantic comedy film released in 2009
 Sex in Public (TV series), an American reality television series that aired on TLC in 2015